In Their Own Sweet Way is a 1998 studio album by pianist Dave Brubeck and his quintet. Brubeck was accompanied by his four sons on a recording for the first time.

The album consists of Brubeck's own compositions, with the exception of the final track, "Sweet Georigia Brown". "We Will All Remember Paul" and "My One Bad Habit" were recorded as tributes to Paul Desmond and Ella Fitzgerald respectively. The composition "Bifocal Blues" was originally called "Bitonal Blues" and humorously rechristened in honour of Brubeck's advanced age.

Reception

Richard S. Ginell reviewed the album for Allmusic and wrote that the album "As do most of Dave's Telarc albums, this one has an autumnal tone as the mellowing septuagenarian pianist plays the wise old master, playing in a more lyrical, reflective manner, revisiting past work and contributing a few new tunes. When Dave and Darius play together, Dave still remains the more immediately striking personality while Darius leans more toward mainstream jazz styles. ...Dave Brubeck's Indian summer continues to be an unusually fruitful one".

Ginell praised Darius Brubeck on "Dave 'n Darius", a duet with his father, and highlighted Dan Brubeck's "...cooking New Orleans funk (in 7/4 time!)" on "Sweet Georgia Brown."

Track listing 
All compositions by Dave Brubeck unless otherwise noted

 "In Your Own Sweet Way" – 6:34
 "Bifocal Blues" – 6:49
 "Sermon on the Mount" – 7:53
 "Michael, My Second Son" – 4:21
 "Ode to a Cowboy" – 7:58
 "Dave 'N Darius" – 6:48
 "We Will Remember Paul" – 5:57
 "Sixth Sense" – 7:32
 "My One Bad Habit" (Dave Brubeck, Iola Brubeck)  – 8:26
 "Sweet Georgia Brown" (Ben Bernie, Kenneth Casey, Maceo Pinkard)  – 6:46

Personnel 
 Dave Brubeck - piano
 Matthew Brubeck - cello
 Darius Brubeck - electric piano
 Chris Brubeck - electric bass, bass trombone
 Dan Brubeck - drums

Production
 Bruce Leek, Jack Renner - engineer

References

1997 albums
Dave Brubeck albums
Instrumental albums
Telarc Records albums